"Skirt" is a song recorded by Australian singer Kylie Minogue. It premiered on her SoundCloud channel on 28 May 2013—Minogue's 45th birthday— until a digital release was issued by Rising Music on 24 June 2013 via Beatport. The track was written by Minogue, alongside Chris Elliot, Chris Lake, and The-Dream, whilst production was handled under Elliot's stage name, Nom de Strip. Although it premiered as a promotional single for the singer's twelfth studio album, Kiss Me Once (2014), she didn't include it on the album and dubbed it a buzz single. Musically, it is an EDM track that incorporates influences of dubstep, and samples Nom de Strip's composition, "Shake & Bake", with collaborator DJ Bones. Lyrically, it delves into sexual seduction, with Minogue wanting to attract male attention.

"Skirt" received positive reviews from music critics, who commended the production and Minogue's return to mainstream dance music. Some critics, such as Billboard, listed the track amongst many others on their year-end lists. Commercially, the track experienced success on the US Billboard Dance Club Songs chart, peaking atop. Additionally, it managed to enter the Hot Dance/Electronic Songs at number 18. An accompanying lyric video was published on the singer's YouTube channel, featuring several stills of her inside a hotel room. In order to promote the single, it was included as an interlude featurette for her Kiss Me Once Tour (2014–15).

Background and production
Following the release of the orchestra compilation album The Abbey Road Sessions in October 2012, Kylie Minogue parted ways with her long-term manager Terry Blamey and the British label EMI after it was taken over by Universal Music. In February 2013, Minogue announced she had signed a management deal with Roc Nation, an entertainment agency handled by American rapper and businessman Jay-Z, while Parlophone would continue to release her music. She also confirmed working on her 12th studio album and a single.

In February 2012, DJ Bones and Chris Elliot (who used his stage name Nom de Strip) released a two-track EP under the independent label DirtyNitrus. The EP features an instrumental composition titled "Shake & Bake" as the B-side track. Elliot wrote "Shake & Bake" using Logic Pro when he was working in music shops. In 2013, Elliot caught the attention of British producer Chris Lake, who then signed him an exclusive deal to Rising Music, a Los Angeles-based independent label established by Lake. That year, Lake and Elliot were introduced to Minogue through her manager, Jay Brown, when they were having meetings in the same building. The producers gave a selection of demo tapes to Minogue and Brown, who selected "Shake & Bake" to record later that night. Elliot and his label-mate Marco Lys co-produced the track, using Elliot's stage name Nom de Strip. Lake, Elliot, and Minogue co-wrote the track with American songwriter The-Dream. Lake was pleased with the working experience with Minogue, saying: "She's honestly a very warm human being and a great artist. 'Skirt' rocks!"

Composition and release

"Skirt" is an electronic dance, dubstep, and house-pop track that samples Nom de Strip's "Shake & Bake" original composition. It is written in the key of D♭ major and has a moderately fast tempo of 128 beats per minute. The track has a sparse production between the verses and centers around a bass-laden hook, which comes more than a minute into the track and only appears twice. It opens with electronic beats and features instrumentation of keyboards, synthesizers, and a drum machine. "Skirt" has no middle-eight section, and builds up to Minogue singing the final chorus. Minogue's vocals are distorted and thoroughly synthesized; she can be heard moaning towards the end of the track. The-Dream also contributed his background vocals, making breathy exclamations at the 2:03 mark. Lyrically, "Skirt" delves into sexual seduction, with Minogue wanting to drop her skirt to attract attention.

Music critics described "Skirt" as a more experimental and dance-orientated work from Minogue. According to Jason Lipshutz from Billboard, the track "squeezes in a generous helping of revved-up dubstep production before its crescendo reintroduces Minogue's fluttering voice." Likewise, Robbie Daw of Idolator labelled it a "slightly dubstep-tinged and somewhat minimal club track". However, Melinda Newman at Hitfix.com noted several sonic interpretations including "industrial beats" and "heavy stutters". Lake was pleased with her decision, stating: "It’s very daring and really challenging for a casual listener. I’m really glad that [Minogue] had the balls to go ahead and choose the record and put it out." "I’m really excited that a record like ‘Skirt’ happened", Lake said after the track was recorded.

Elliot first played "Skirt" during his set at the Pacha Ibiza nightclub before the track's premiere on his SoundCloud account on 28 May 2013, Minogue's 45th birthday. The release was made without any prior official announcement; Minogue announced the track with a post on Twitter: "Birthday surprise!!". Lake released the track and its accompanying remixes under his label Rising Music. The label distributed "Skirt" as a digital EP on 24 June 2013, exclusively through Beatport. The six-track EP included four remixes, individually produced by Nom de Strip, electronic duo GTA, English DJ Switch, and American DJ Hot Mouth. The EP was physically released in Europe and the US by Parlophone, while EMI and Gold Typhoon handled the Chinese release. These releases contain remixes conducted by American producers Matthew Dear and Mark Picchiotti, the latter is uncredited for producing the mixes of the original Nom De Strip productions. "Skirt" was not included on the tracklist of Kiss Me Once, Minogue's studio album released in 2014.

Reception
"Skirt" received positive reviews from music critics. Jason Lipshutz of Billboard commended the production and composition of the single, labelling it a "slithering club" anthem. Robbie Daw, writing for Idolator, compared its themes to the singer's 2003 single "Slow", but believed "Skirt" "delivers with a truly delicious chorus — something we’ve come to expect from Minogue over the years as one of the world’s reigning pop forces." Likewise, Slant Magazine'''s Alexa Camp commended the track's composition and production, but felt disappointing that it was left off Minogue's Kiss Me Once album. In the review, she noted that the only recording on the record that was reminiscent of "Skirt" was "Sexercize", both "sonically and thematically" similar to each other. Matthew Jacobs of The Huffington Post gave it a positive review, saying it was "a pulsating new song that blends electronic beats with her reverb-heavy vocal effects". A member at Paper labelled it a "synthy banger", whilst Complex editor, Edwin Ortiz, called the track "hot". Labelling it "fabolous", a member at Arcadey.net felt "Skirt" was "both quintessentially Kylie and brand new territory for the pop diva. The new Kylie is hipper and harder-edged, and for the first time in a long time,".

Conversely, "Skirt" received mixed and negative remarks nevertheless. Although Sal Cinquemani, writing for Slant Magazine, was equally positive towards Minogue's move to dance music and the production of the track, he was critical towards the composition, labelling the dubstep breakdown as "ugly". A member at Radio Creme Brulee was negative, awarding it one star out of five. The review remarked, "Kylie has to give us something substantial enough to make us forget that “Skirt” ever saw the light of day." The website also criticized the production and composition of the track, believing it was too different to Minogue's previous offerings from Aphrodite (2010). Despite this, it was named as one of the "Top 50 Game-Changing EDM Tracks of 2013" by Billboard, ranked at number 36 by members Zel McCarthy and Kerri Mason.

On the US Billboard Dance Club Songs chart, it debuted at number 37 during the week end of 27 July 2013. By its fifth week, on 17 August, it reached the top ten by charting at number seven. "Skirt" reached atop of the charts and stayed there for a sole week—during week end of 14 September—and became her 10th number one, and seventh consecutive number one in that competent chart. Overall, it was present on the chart for 13 weeks. It peaked at number 18 on the Hot Dance/Electronic Songs, and spent 5 weeks there. By the end of 2013, "Skirt" was ranked at number 23 on Billboards annual Dance Club Songs chart.

Promotion
Prior to its premiere on SoundCloud, Elliot first played "Skirt" during his set at the Pacha Ibiza nightclub. On 14 June 2013, an accompanying lyric video was published on Nowness and YouTube. Directed and photographed by Will Davidson, the video is a series of quick cuts of over 1,000 still photos of the singer seductively posing in a hotel room. At one point, Minogue is seen writhing around on the floor with an arch back, and looking straight to the camera. She wears an Alexander Wang tight-fitting black dress, Vanessa Bruno and Jimmy Choo stilettos. The three-hour shoot took place in Los Angeles a week before its premiere. Minogue was impressed by Davidson's natural approach, saying: "In 25 years I haven't done anything like this... They feel real, unprocessed and much like the viewer is there with me." Melinda Newman, writing for Hitfix.com, gave the visual a B grading, stating "It may be just a fancy lyric video, but it's hot." Beth Hardie of Mirror.co.uk jokingly commented that Minogue "is definitely not letting (Jay-Z) down with her new very dirty (in bass line, lyrics and saucy video) single, Skirt...".

A second visual was used as an interlude featurette for Minogue's Kiss Me Once Tour, which was included in the set list after the 80's Medley. The video has Minogue in a Rolls-Royce, wearing suspenders and fish net stockings, whilst being driven around by a male figure. As the track progresses, rain starts falling onto the car as Minogue gazes out the window. The visual was only used during the European leg of the tour, and was omitted from the Australian part; however, a two-minute version was included on the live DVD as a bonus feature. Despite not being used, "Skirt" was performed at a one-off MasterCard Priceless concert gig in London in March 2014.

Track listingsDigital remix EP"Skirt" (Main Mix) – 3:29
"Skirt" (Extended Mix) – 4:47
"Skirt" (Nom De Strip Dub Mix) – 4:48
"Skirt" (GTA Remix) – 5:10
"Skirt" (Switch Remix) – 5:33
"Skirt" (Hot Mouth Remix) – 4:43Chinese remix EP'"Skirt" (Main Mix) – 3:29
"Skirt" (Extended Mix) – 4:47
"Skirt" (Nom De Strip Dub Mix) – 4:48
"Skirt" (GTA Remix) – 5:10
"Skirt" (Switch Remix) – 5:33
"Skirt" (Hot Mouth Remix) – 4:43
"Skirt" (George M Dub Bootleg Mix) – 7:07
"Skirt" (Official Extended Mix) – 4:47
"Skirt" (Remastered) – 3:30
"Skirt" (Richie Bardot Dub) – 5:22
"Skirt" (Stopme Shake Mix) – 5:15

Personnel
Credits are adapted from the American Society of Composers, Authors and Publishers.
Kylie Minogue – vocals, songwriting
Chris Elliot – songwriting, production
 Marco Lys – production
Chris Lake – songwriting
Terius "The Dream" Nash – songwriting, background vocals

Charts

Weekly charts

Year-end chart

Release history

See also
 List of Billboard Dance Club Songs number ones of 2013

Notes

References
Citations

Websites and print sources

 
 
 
 
 
 
 
 
 
 

 
 
 
 
 
 
 
 
 
 
 
 
 
 
 

Media notes

 
 
 
 
 
 
 
 

External links
 "Skirt" lyrics on Kylie.com'' (archive from 2013)
 

2013 singles
2013 songs
Kylie Minogue songs
Songs written by Kylie Minogue
Songs written by The-Dream